Rodica Dunca (later Kőszegi, born 16 May 1965) is a retired Romanian artistic gymnast. She won the world title in 1979 and an Olympic silver medal in 1980 with the Romanian team. Individually, she won a European bronze medal on beam in 1981. After retiring from competitions she worked as gymnastics coach at CSM Baia Mare.

References

External links

List of competitive results at Gymn Forum

Living people
Romanian female artistic gymnasts
Gymnasts at the 1980 Summer Olympics
Olympic gymnasts of Romania
Olympic silver medalists for Romania
Medalists at the World Artistic Gymnastics Championships
Sportspeople from Baia Mare
1965 births
Olympic medalists in gymnastics
Medalists at the 1980 Summer Olympics
Universiade medalists in gymnastics
Universiade silver medalists for Romania
Medalists at the 1981 Summer Universiade